Diego López de la Vega (1591 – 5 June 1659) was a Roman Catholic prelate who served as Bishop of Coria (1658–1659) and Bishop of Badajoz (1649–1658).

Biography
Diego López de la Vega was born in Tortuera, Spain in 1591.
On 29 April 1649, he was selected by the King of Spain and confirmed by Pope Innocent X on 23 August 1649 as Bishop of Badajoz.
On 6 March 1650, he was consecrated bishop by Juan de Palafox y Mendoza, Bishop of Tlaxcala.
On 28 January 1658, he was appointed during the papacy of Pope Alexander VII as Bishop of Coria.
He served as Bishop of Coria until his death on 5 June 1659.

References

External links and additional sources
 (for Chronology of Bishops)
 (for Chronology of Bishops)
 (for Chronology of Bishops) 
 (for Chronology of Bishops) 

17th-century Roman Catholic bishops in Spain
Bishops appointed by Pope Innocent X
Bishops appointed by Pope Alexander VII
1591 births
1659 deaths